Josh Payne (born 10 December 1993) is an English darts player who competes in Professional Darts Corporation events.

Career
Payne won his first title in 2013 at a PDC Challenge Tour event by beating Rowby-John Rodriguez 4–3 in the final. He also qualified for the Gibraltar Darts Trophy and beat Wayne Jones 6–2, before losing 6–1 to Dave Chisnall in the second round despite averaging 100.50.

In 2014, Payne reached the final of the first two Youth Tour events, losing to Nick Kenny and Lewis Venes respectively. He qualified for the UK Open for the first time and lost 5–4 to Andy Boulton in the second round. At the fifth Players Championship of the year Payne recorded wins over three-time world champion John Part and 2012 UK Open winner Robert Thornton to reach the last 16 of a PDC event for the first time, where he was whitewashed 6–0 by Mervyn King. He also won through to the last 16 of the World Youth Championship and lost 6–4 to Jack Twedwell. In September, Payne came from 3–0 down in the final of a Youth Tour event to beat Jake Jones 4–3 and he lost by a reverse of this scoreline in the final of the 16th event to Dean Reynolds. He finished second on the Youth Tour Order of Merit to earn a two-year PDC tour card which commenced in 2015.

At the 2015 UK Open, Payne defeated Lionel Sams 5–3, Dave Prins 5–4 and Andy Jenkins 9–6 to play in the fourth round, where Mensur Suljović beat him 9–4. Payne beat Wayne Jones, Stephen Bunting and Michael Smith at the Dutch Darts Masters to play in the quarter-finals of a PDC event for the first time, where he lost 6–4 to Justin Pipe. Payne finished as the runner-up in two Development Tour in the second half of the year, as well as being a quarter-finalist in the World Youth Championship.

Payne lost 9–5 to Ryan de Vreede in the third round of the 2016 UK Open. He took the third Development Tour event by defeating Rowby-John Rodriguez in the final.
In May, Payne beat Gerwyn Price, Ronny Huybrechts, Wes Newton, Mensur Suljović and Steve Brown to play in the final of the sixth Players Championship. He then claimed the title with a 6–5 victory over James Wade, sealing it with a 116 finish with Wade waiting on 40. This win saw him qualify for the World Matchplay. On his debut in the event Payne was defeated 10–7 by Robert Thornton. Payne received an invitation to play in the World Series of Darts Finals and was ousted 6–3 by Daryl Gurney in the opening round.

Payne qualified for his first World Championship in the 2017 event through the Pro Tour Order of Merit and he won the first set versus Terry Jenkins. He went 2–1 down and missed one dart to square the match, going on instead to be beaten 3–1.

At the end of the 2021 season, Payne lost his tour card and had to qualify back through the PDC Q-school. He was unsuccessful in his attempt winning only 1 point, which was not enough to earn a 2 year tour card. 

He earned back his Tour card in Q-School 2023.

World Championship results

PDC

 2017: First round (lost to Terry Jenkins 1–3)
 2019: Second round (lost to Dave Chisnall 2–3)
 2020: Second round (lost to Dimitri Van den Bergh 0–3)

Performance timeline

PDC European Tour

References

External links

Living people
Professional Darts Corporation current tour card holders
English darts players
1993 births
Sportspeople from Wolverhampton
PDC ranking title winners